Acts or ACTS may refer to:

Christianity
 Acts of the Apostles (genre), a genre of early Christian literature
 Acts of the Apostles, the fifth book in the Bible's New Testament
 ACTS Retirement-Life Communities, a faith-based long-term care network
 Action of Churches Together in Scotland, the national ecumenical organisation for inter-church relations in Scotland
Communications and television
 Advance Community Television Station, a television station in Trinidad and Tobago
 Advanced Communications Technology Satellite (ACTS), a satellite launched in 1993 by Space Shuttle Discovery on mission STS-51
 American Christian Television System, a defunct television network run by the Southern Baptist Convention
 Air Corps Tactical School, the first military professional development school for officers of the US Army Air Service and US Army Air Corps
 Advanced Crew Transportation System, a proposed joint European/Russian/Japanese crewed spaceflight system
Computing, automation, computer networks
  Automated Coin Toll System, a system used for collecting coins at payphones

Healthcare
  Alliance for Community Transfusion Services (ACTS), a strategic alliance of community blood centers in the United States
Trade Union
 Administrative, Clerical, Technical and Supervisory section of the former TGWU, a British trade union, now amalgamated into the Unite trade union

Transportation
 ACTS Nederland BV, railfreight company in the Netherlands
 ACTS (roller container), Abroll Container Transport System (German) or Afzet Container Transport Systeem (Dutch), a type of intermodal road/rail container system designed for operation without the use of cranes or lifting gear

See also
 Act (disambiguation)
 ACT (disambiguation)
 Artemisinin-based Combination Therapies, an antimalarial medication